The Columbia River Washington Temple is the 107th operating temple of the Church of Jesus Christ of Latter-day Saints (LDS Church).

The Columbia River Washington Temple, located in Richland near Badger Mountain, is the third temple in the state of Washington, following the Seattle Washington and Spokane Washington temples.

History
Church membership in Washington has grown from 67,000 members in 1970 to nearly 230,000 in 2001. With the growth church, leaders felt another temple should be built within the state. This temple serves members in eastern Washington and northern Oregon.

Some parts of the temple foundation includes 2-inch river rock used as fill in concrete forms.  During construction of the temple, people were allowed access to open bins of this river rock at the edge of the construction site.  Many people wrote names of children, loved ones, etc. on the rocks that were later incorporated into the building itself.

The temple was announced in April 2000 and groundbreaking ceremonies followed that same year.  Stephen A. West, a member of the Second Quorum of the Seventy, who himself served as a missionary in the area many years before, presided at the groundbreaking ceremony.

Before the temple was dedicated it was opened to the public. Nearly 65,000 people visited the temple during the open house period.  LDS Church president Gordon B. Hinckley dedicated the Columbia River Washington Temple on November 18, 2001. Allan D. Alder and his wife, Roma, of Hermiston, Oregon were the first temple president and matron (2001–2004).

This temple marked a return to the use of murals to decorate one or more of the ordinance rooms used in the endowment ceremony. Murals reflecting the progressive nature of the endowment had been a standard feature of temples from those first constructed in Utah through the Los Angeles Temple, which was dedicated in 1956. The Columbia River Washington Temple has a first room decorated with murals which leads into a second room without murals. This pattern has been followed in most temples dedicated since.

In 2020, like all the church's other temples, the Columbia River Washington Temple was closed in response to the coronavirus pandemic.

See also 

 The Church of Jesus Christ of Latter-day Saints in Washington
 Comparison of temples of The Church of Jesus Christ of Latter-day Saints
 List of temples of The Church of Jesus Christ of Latter-day Saints
 List of temples of The Church of Jesus Christ of Latter-day Saints by geographic region
 Temple architecture (Latter-day Saints)

References

External links 
 Official Columbia River Washington Temple page
 Columbia River Washington Temple at ChurchofJesusChristTemples.org

21st-century Latter Day Saint temples
Buildings and structures in Benton County, Washington
The Church of Jesus Christ of Latter-day Saints in Washington (state)
Religious buildings and structures in Washington (state)
Temples (LDS Church) completed in 2001
Richland, Washington
Temples (LDS Church) in the United States
2001 establishments in Washington (state)